Boskops are a German punk band from Hannover. They were formerly named Blitzkrieg.

References

German musical groups